Karigaila (died on 16 September 1390 in Vilnius) was a son of Algirdas, Grand Duke of Lithuania, and his second wife Uliana of Tver. He became the ruler of Mstsislaw after he captured it from the Principality of Smolensk. He is sometimes mistaken for his brother Constantine, who was the founder of the House of Czartoryski.

After his older brother Jogaila signed the Union of Krewo, Karigaila was baptized as Casimir in Kraków in March 1386. He then left Poland for the eastern part of the Grand Duchy of Lithuania in order to subdue his half-brother Andrei of Polotsk, who had renewed his struggle for power against Jogaila. On 29 April 1386, he and his other brother Skirgaila soundly defeated Sviatoslav II of Smolensk, who had allied himself with Andrei and attacked Mstsislaw, in the Battle of the Vekhra River. 

During the Lithuanian Civil War (1389–92), Karigaila commanded the defence of the Crooked Castle in Vilnius. The castle fell and he was killed. His brother Jogaila, now king of Poland, charged that Karigaila was taken captive and executed by decapitation by the Teutonic Knights; the Knights denied this and claimed that Karigaila was killed during the battle. Karigaila was buried at Vilnius Cathedral.

See also
 House of Algirdas – family tree of Karigaila

References

14th-century births
1390 deaths
Burials at Vilnius Cathedral
Gediminids
14th-century Lithuanian nobility